Laurie Lickley ( Johnson) is an American politician and rancher from Idaho. Lickley is a Republican member of the Idaho House of Representatives from District 25A.

Early life 
Lickley was born in Salmon, Idaho. In 1986, Lickley graduated from Salmon High School.

Education 
In 1990, Lickley earned a Bachelor of Science degree in agricultural economics from the University of Idaho.

Career 
Lickley is a rancher in Idaho.

In November 2015, Lickley began serving as the President of Idaho Cattle Association.

On May 15, 2018, Lickley won the Republican Primary Election for Idaho House of Representatives. Lickley sought a seat in District 25 seat A. Lickley defeated B. Roy Prescott and Glenneda Zuiderveld with 49.8% if the votes.

On November 6, 2018, Lickley won the election and became a Republican member of Idaho House of Representatives for District 25 Seat A. Lickley succeeded Maxine Bell, who served in Idaho House of Representatives for 30 years.

In legislation, Lickley is a member of the Environment, Energy, & Technology Committee, Health & Welfare Committee, and Resources & Conservation Committee.

Awards 
 2004 Idaho Cattle Woman of the Year.

Personal life 
Lickley's husband is Bill, a rancher. They have two children, Valene and Cole. Lickley and her family live outside of Jerome, Idaho.

References

External links 
 Idaho House Membership
 2018 Primary Election Results at archive.org

Living people
21st-century American women politicians
21st-century American politicians
Republican Party members of the Idaho House of Representatives
University of Idaho alumni
Year of birth missing (living people)
Women state legislators in Idaho